William Chadbourne (29 October 1922 – 1988) was an English professional footballer who played in the Football League for Mansfield Town.

References

1922 births
1988 deaths
English footballers
Association football inside forwards
English Football League players
Mansfield Town F.C. players
Ashfield United F.C. players